Mark Rowe (born July 28, 1960) is an American former sprinter.

References

1960 births
Living people
American male sprinters
Place of birth missing (living people)
Athletes (track and field) at the 1987 Pan American Games
Pan American Games gold medalists for the United States
Pan American Games medalists in athletics (track and field)
World Athletics Indoor Championships medalists
Medalists at the 1987 Pan American Games